Aethioprocris togoensis is a moth of the family Zygaenidae. It is known from the small African nation of Togo.

References

Procridinae
Moths of Africa
Moths described in 1954